Gowzluy, also rendered as Gowzlu may refer to:
 Gowzluy-e Olya
 Gowzluy-e Sofla